Vlado Keselj (Vlado Kešelj) is a Serbian-Canadian computer scientist known for his research in natural language processing and authorship attribution. He is a professor at Dalhousie University.

Education
As a high school student in Yugoslavia, Keselj competed in the 1987 International Mathematical Olympiad, earning a bronze medal. He earned his Ph.D. in 2002 at the University of Waterloo, with the dissertation Modular Stochastic HPSGs for Question Answering supervised by Nick Cercone.

Awards 
Vlado Keselj is a recipient of the 2019 CAIAC Distinguished Service Award, awarded by the Canadian Artificial Intelligence Association (CAIAC).

Selected publications
 Kešelj, V., Peng, F., Cercone, N., & Thomas, C. (2003, August). N-gram-based author profiles for authorship attribution. In Proceedings of the Conference of the Pacific Association for Computational Linguistics, PACLING 2003 (Vol. 3, pp. 255–264).

References

External links 
 

Computer scientists
Living people
Year of birth missing (living people)
Natural language processing researchers